
The Volkskammer (People's Chamber) was the unicameral legislature of the German Democratic Republic (colloquially known as East Germany).

The Volkskammer was initially the lower house of a bicameral legislature. The upper house was the Chamber of States, or Länderkammer, but in 1952 the states of East Germany were dissolved, and the Chamber was abolished in 1958. Constitutionally, the Volkskammer was the highest organ of state power in the GDR, and both constitutions vested it with great lawmaking powers. All other branches of government, including the judiciary, were responsible to it. By 1960, the chamber appointed the Council of the State, the Council of Ministers, and the National Defence Council. In practice, however, it was a pseudo-parliament that did little more than rubber-stamp decisions already made by the SED — always by unanimous consent — and listen to the General Secretary's speeches.

Membership
In October 1949 the Volksrat charged with drafting the Constitution of East Germany proclaimed itself the Volkskammer and requested official recognition as a national legislature from the Soviet Military Administration in Germany. This was granted by Soviet Deputy Foreign Minister Andrei Gromyko. The Volkskammer then convened with the Landerkammer to elect Wilhelm Pieck as the first President of East Germany and Otto Grotewohl as the first Prime Minister of East Germany. 

From its founding in 1949 until the first competitive elections in March 1990, all members of the Volkskammer were elected via a single list from the National Front, a popular front/electoral alliance dominated by the SED. In addition, seats were also allocated to various organizations affiliated with the SED, such as the Free German Youth. Effectively, the SED held control over the composition of the Volkskammer. In any event, the minor parties in the National Front were largely subservient to the SED, and were required to accept the SED's "leading role" as a condition of their continued existence.  

The members of the People's Chamber were elected in multi-member constituencies, with four to eight seats. To be elected, a candidate needed to receive half of the valid votes cast in their constituency. If, within a constituency, an insufficient number of candidates got the majority needed to fill all the seats, a second round was held within 90 days. If the number of candidates getting this majority exceeds the number of seats in the respective constituency, the order of the candidates on the election list decided who got to sit in the Volkskammer. Candidates who lost out on a seat because of this would become successor candidates who would fill casual vacancies which might occur during a legislative period.

Only one list of candidates appeared on a ballot paper; voters simply took the ballot paper and dropped it into the ballot box. Those who wanted to vote against the National Front list had to vote using a separate ballot box, without any secrecy. The table below shows an overview of the reported results of all parliamentary elections before 1990, with the resulting disposition of parliamentary seats.

In 1976, the Volkskammer moved into a specially constructed building on Marx-Engels-Platz (now Schloßplatz again), the Palace of the Republic (Palast der Republik).

Initially, voters in East Berlin could not take part in elections to the Volkskammer, in which they were represented by indirectly elected non-voting members, but in 1979 the electoral law was changed to provide for 66 directly elected deputies with full voting rights.

After the 1990 election, the disposition of the parties was as follows:

{| class="wikitable"
!Party/Group
!Acronym
!Members
|-
|Alliance for Germany
|CDU, DA, DSU
|192
|-
|Social Democratic Party in the GDR
|SPD
|88
|-
|Party of Democratic Socialism
|PDS, former SED
|66
|-
|Association of Free DemocratsDFP, FDP, LDP
|21
|-
|Alliance 90
|B90
|12
|-
|Green Party and Independent Women's Association
|Grüne, UFV
|8
|-
|National Democratic Party of Germany
|NDPD
|2
|-
|Democratic Women's League of Germany
|DFD
|1
|-
|United Left
|VL
|1
|}

Presidents of the People's Chamber

The president of the People's Chamber was the third-highest state post in the GDR (after the chairman of the Council of Ministers and the chairman of the State Council) and was the ex officio  deputy to the president of the country during the existence of the office of president. As such, on two occasions, the president of the People's Chamber served as acting president for brief periods in 1949 and 1960. The last president of the People's Chamber, Sabine Bergmann-Pohl, was also interim head of state during the last six months of East Germany's existence due to the State Council having been abolished. The presidency of the People's Chamber was held by a bloc party representative for most of that body's existence; only one SED member ever held the post.

See also

Elections in East Germany
Presidium of the People's Chamber
Show election

Notes

References

External links

A Successful Policy Seared to the Needs of the People - Deliberations of the Volkskammer on nuclear disarmament, 1981.

 
Government of East Germany
Defunct unicameral legislatures
1949 establishments in East Germany
1990 disestablishments in East Germany